United States v. Fordice, 505 U.S. 717 (1992), is a United States Supreme Court case that resulted in an eight to one ruling that the eight public universities in Mississippi had not sufficiently integrated and that the state must take affirmative action to change this under the Equal Protection Clause. The Court found that, although the state had eliminated explicit prohibitions on the admission of black students to institutions including the University of Mississippi, Mississippi State University, and the University of Southern Mississippi, the Court of Appeals had not properly reviewed the set of discriminatory policies used by the state to suppress black enrollment at these schools. On this point, the Court stated that "[i]f the State perpetuates policies and practices traceable to its prior system that continue to have segregative effects - whether by influencing student enrollment decisions or by fostering segregation in other facets of the university system - and such policies are without sound educational justification and can be practicably eliminated, the State has not satisfied its burden of proving that it has dismantled its prior system."

Four opinions were filed in the case. In addition to Justice White's majority opinion, Justice O'Connor and Justice Thomas filed concurring opinions. Thomas, in particular, expressed a concern that the strict review of policies that divided students by race should not be used against historically black universities in the state.

Justice Scalia filed a separate opinion concurring in part and dissenting in part, expressing his disagreement with the burden that the Court imposed on universities and his concern that the standards set forth by the Court would create confusion and lead to more litigation.

See also
 List of United States Supreme Court cases, volume 505
 List of United States Supreme Court cases
 Lists of United States Supreme Court cases by volume
 List of United States Supreme Court cases by the Rehnquist Court

References

External links
 

United States Supreme Court cases
United States Supreme Court cases of the Rehnquist Court
1992 in United States case law
United States equal protection case law
United States affirmative action case law
United States racial discrimination case law